Canadian Forest Navigation (Canfornav) is a Canadian shipping firm. It operates a fleet of close to four dozen bulk carriers.  Most of these vessels' voyages are between ports on the North American Great Lakes or the St Lawrence Seaway.

Boat nerd reported in 2002 the firm had employed chartered vessels, in the past. However, because the cost per ton of newly built ships had dropped, they were going to begin ordering newly built vessels.

References 

Shipping companies of Canada